Souk El Berka is one of the souks of the medina of Tunis. The market traders specialize in the jewellery trade.

History 
El Berka was built by Yusuf Dey in 1612 and was meant to sell slaves coming from West and Central Africa. Slaves of European origin, considered rarer and more precious, were not sold in the souk but in private locations because the sale concerned only wealthy potential buyers. This souk turned into a jewelers' souk after the abolition of slavery in Tunisia, decreed by Ahmad I ibn Mustafa in 1846.

Location 

The souk is located near the kasbah, the seat of the head of government, Dar El Bey and other souks, for example Souk El Bey, Souk Ech-Chaouachine, and Souk El Leffa. It is perpendicular to Souk El Trouk (Turks).

Architecture 
Located at the crossroads of four streets, Souk El Berka takes a square shape and has three aisles separated by two rows of columns. Formerly a wooden platform at the centre was the place where slaves were presented (that was the origin of the name berka) and waited for the outcome of the sale. The place was covered by a central dome and several side vaults.

References

External links 
  Presentation of the souk (Municipality of Tunis)
  Virtual visit of Souk El Berka

Berka
1612 establishments in the Ottoman Empire
1612 establishments in Africa